Dmitry Paperno (1929 in Kyiv – 2020 in Northbrook, IL) was a Soviet and American concert pianist.

In 1955, Paperno won 6th Prize in the V International Chopin Piano Competition, and then recorded and performed widely under the Soviet regime. He attended the Moscow Conservatory where he studied under Alexander Goldenweiser. Paperno recorded for Melodiya and prior to recording with Cedille Records. Paperno became a tenured professor at DePaul University after moving to the United States in 1976. He is the author of the book Notes of a Moscow Pianist.

References

External links
Artist profile at bach-cantatas.com
Cedille Records biography

1929 births
Living people
Ukrainian classical pianists
Soviet emigrants to the United States
DePaul University faculty
Russian classical pianists
Male classical pianists
Moscow Conservatory alumni
Prize-winners of the International Chopin Piano Competition
Musicians from Kyiv
Cedille Records artists